Charanjeet Singh Rori was the member of Parliament from Sirsa Lok Sabha Constituency for 16th Lok Sabha. He was defeated by Sunita Duggal (Member of parliament from 17th Lok Sabha) in 2019, Lok Sabha elections with a margin of  votes. He defeated sitting MP Dr Ashok Tanwar by 115, 736 votes in 2014 Lok Sabha elections. He is member of the I.N.L.D.(Indian National Lok Dal) Party. He is a prominent leader of Shirmoni Akali Dal. In 2014 Lok Sabha Elections, Sardar Parkash Singh Badal and Sukhbir Singh Badal Campaigned for him. He joined Indian National Congress

References 

Living people
India MPs 2014–2019
Indian National Lok Dal politicians
People from Sirsa district
People from Sirsa, Haryana
Lok Sabha members from Haryana
Shiromani Akali Dal politicians
1969 births
Indian National Congress politicians